A Bridge I Didn't Burn is the sixth studio album by American country music artist Ricky Van Shelton. The tracks "A Couple of Good Years Left" and "Where Was I" were released as singles. The first failed to reach the top 40 while the latter peaked at number 20 on the charts.

"Heartache Big As Texas" was originally released in 1991 on a promotional single (CSK 4062) as an extended dance mix. "Linda Lu" is a cover of R&B Artist Ray Sharpe's hit from 1959.

Track listing

Release history

Personnel
Musicians

 Victor Battista – Double Bass
 Eddie Bayers – Drums
 Barry Beckett – Piano
 Mark Casstevens – Acoustic Guitar
 Jerry Douglas – Dobro
 Paul Franklin – Steel guitar, Pedabro
 Sonny Garrish – Steel Guitar
 Steve Gibson – Electric Guitar, Mandolin
 Rob Hajacos – Fiddle
 Jim Horn – Saxophone
 Roy Huskey – Double Bass
 Bill Lloyd – Electric guitar
 Randy McCormick – Piano
 Terry McMillan – Harmonica
 Brent Mason – Electric Guitar
 Gary Nicholson – Electric Guitar
 Mark O'Connor – Fiddle
 Don Potter – Acoustic guitar
 Tom Robb – Bass Guitar
 Ricky Van Shelton – Acoustic Guitar, Lead Vocals
 Tommy Wells – Drums

Background Vocals
 Gary Burr
 Harry Stinson
 John Wesley Ryles
 Dennis Wilson
 Billy Yates

Production
 Chief Engineers
 Marshall Morgan
 Gary Laney
 Toby Seay
 Joe Bogan
 Assistant Engineers: Ken Hutton & John Kunz
 Mastered By: Denny Purcell
 Art Direction: Bill Johnson & Rollow Welch
 Photography: Mark Hanauer & Terry Calonge (Cover)
 Cover Art: Jeff Wack & Steve Flatt

Chart performance

Sources
 Allmusic (See Reviews in infobox)
 Liner Notes: “A Bridge I Didn't Burn.” Ricky Van Shelton. Columbia, 1993.

1993 albums
Columbia Records albums
Ricky Van Shelton albums
Albums produced by Steve Buckingham (record producer)